The Everett Raptors were a professional indoor football team based in Everett, Washington. The Raptors were member of the Intense Conference of the Indoor Football League (IFL). They played their home games at the Comcast Arena at Everett in Everett.

The Raptors franchise was the relocated team previously known as the Kent Predators and later the Seattle Timberwolves.

As of 2012, the Everett Raptors are out of the IFL. The parent company filed for bankruptcy, and the team was not in the league in 2012–2013.

History

The franchise was originally going to play in Wasilla, Alaska as the Arctic Predators, but complications between the ownership and the would-be head coach led to difficulty in obtaining a lease, so the IFL and the Arctic Predators split ways. However, the A-Preds did not fold immediately; they played that season in the American Indoor Football Association.

On January 10, 2011, the Kent Predators were sold to Jeffery Scott, who hired new head coach Keith Evans, just two days later. On April 13, the team was sold again, this time to Tom Dowling, changed the team's name to the Seattle Timberwovles while naming Mike Berry the team general manager, and Sean Ponder the team's new head coach.

On October 18, 2011, it was announced that the Timberwolves were moving to Everett, adopting the new Everett Raptors identity.

The Raptors were the second indoor football team to play in Everett, following the Everett Hawks of the National Indoor Football League and later the af2 which played from 2005 until 2007. A team called the Everett Destroyers was proposed for the IFL's inaugural 2009 season, but folded before ever playing a single down.

On July 30, 2012, the parent company, Northwest Pro Sports LLC, filed For Bankruptcy.  The Everett Raptors are now out of IFL and did not play 2012-2013.

Players of note

Final roster

All-IFL players
The following Predators/Timberwolves/Raptors players have been named to All-IFL Teams:
WR Andre Piper-Jordan (2)
OL Vaughn Lesuma
DL John Fields
KR Mike Tatum

Awards and honors
The following is a list of all Predators/Timberwolves/Raptors players who have won league Awards

Head coaches
Note: Statistics are correct through the end of the 2012 Indoor Football League season.

Statistics and records

Season-by-season results
Note: The Finish, Wins, Losses, and Ties columns list regular season results and exclude any postseason play.

References

External links
 Everett Raptors official website
 Indoor Football League website

Former Indoor Football League teams
Sports in Everett, Washington
American football teams in Washington (state)